Sophia Louisa Jex-Blake (21 January 1840 – 7 January 1912) was an English physician, teacher, and feminist. She led the campaign to secure women access to a university education, when six other women and she, collectively known as the Edinburgh Seven, began studying medicine at the University of Edinburgh in 1869. She was the first practising female doctor in Scotland, and one of the first in the wider United Kingdom of Great Britain and Ireland; a leading campaigner for medical education for women, she was involved in founding two medical schools for women, in London and Edinburgh, at a time when no other medical schools were training women.

Early life

Sophia Jex-Blake was born at 3 Croft Place Hastings, England, on 21 January 1840, daughter of retired lawyer Thomas Jex-Blake, a proctor of Doctors' Commons, and Mary Jex-Blake (née Cubitt). Her brother was Thomas Jex-Blake, future Dean of Wells Cathedral, and father of Katharine Jex-Blake, classicist and Mistress of Girton College, Cambridge. Until the age of eight she was home-educated. She attended various private schools in southern England, and in 1858, enrolled at Queen's College, London, despite her parents' objections. In 1859, while still a student, she was offered a post as mathematics tutor at the college where she stayed until 1861, living for some of that time with Octavia Hill's family. She worked without pay; her family did not expect their daughter to earn a living, and indeed her father refused her permission to accept a salary.

In summer 1865, once the Civil War was over, Sophia Jex-Blake travelled to the United States to learn more about women's education. She visited various schools, was strongly influenced by developments in co-education in the US, and later published A Visit to Some American Schools and Colleges. At the New England Hospital for Women and Children in Boston, she met one of the country's pioneer female physicians, Dr Lucy Ellen Sewall, who became an important and lifelong friend, and she worked there for a time as an assistant. This was a turning point for Jex-Blake, as she realised, during this visit, that to become a doctor was her life's vocation.

In 1867, along with Susan Dimock, a trainee from the New England hospital, she wrote directly to the president and fellows of Harvard University, requesting admission to the university's medical school. Dimock and she received their reply a month later, in a letter which stated: "There is no provision for the education of women in any department of this university". The following year, she hoped to attend a new medical college being established by Elizabeth Blackwell in New York, but in the same year, her father died, so she returned to England to be with her mother.

A fair field and no favour

In 1869, Jex-Blake's essay "Medicine as a profession for women" appeared in a book edited by Josephine Butler: Women's Work and Women's Culture. In this, she argued that natural instinct leads women to concern themselves with the care of the sick. With education of girls being restricted to domestic crafts, though, women generally could not qualify to compete with men as medical practitioners. She argued that no objective proof existed of women's intellectual inferiority to men. She said that the matter could easily be tested by granting women "a fair field and no favour" - teaching them as men were taught and subjecting them to exactly the same examinations.

The campaign
Sophia Jex-Blake was determined to seek medical training in the UK, and due to Scotland's already enlightened attitudes towards education, felt that if any university would allow women to study, it would be a Scottish one. She applied to study medicine at the University of Edinburgh in March 1869. and although the medical faculty and the senatus academus voted in favour of allowing her to study medicine, the university court rejected her application on the grounds that the university could not make the necessary arrangements "in the interest of one lady".

She then advertised in The Scotsman and other national newspapers for more women to join her. A second application was submitted in the summer of 1869 on behalf of the group of five women initially (with two more joined later in the year to make the Edinburgh Seven - the group is Mary Anderson, Emily Bovell, Matilda Chaplin, Helen Evans, Sophia Jex-Blake, Edith Pechey, and Isabel Thorne). It requested matriculation and all that that implied - the right to attend all the classes and examinations required for a degree in medicine. This second application was approved by the university court and the University of Edinburgh became the first British university to admit women.

Sophia Jex-Blake wrote in one of her letters to her great friend Lucy Sewall:

"It is a grand thing to enter the very first British University ever opened to women, isn't it?"

Hostility grows and the Surgeons' Hall riot
As the women began to demonstrate that they could compete on equal terms with the male students, hostility towards them began to grow. They received obscene letters, were followed home, had fireworks attached to their front door, and had mud thrown at them. This culminated in the Surgeons' Hall riot on 18 November 1870, when the women arrived to sit for an anatomy examination at Surgeons' Hall, and an angry mob of over 200 gathered outside throwing mud, rubbish, and insults at the women.

The events made national headlines and won the women many new supporters, but influential members of the medical faculty eventually persuaded the university to refuse graduation to the women by appealing decisions to higher courts. The courts eventually ruled that the women who had been awarded degrees should never have been allowed to enter the course. Their degrees were withdrawn and the campaign in Edinburgh failed in 1873. Many of the women went to European universities that were already allowing women to graduate and completed their studies there.

The time for a reform has come 
Women were eventually admitted onto degree programmes at other British Universities in 1877. James Stansfeld, who had been closely associated with the London campaign (following the failure of the Edinburgh campaign) wrote, in his brief history of the events:
Dr Sophia Jex-Blake has made the greatest of all contributions to the end attained. I do not say that she has been the ultimate cause of success. The ultimate cause has been simply this, that the time was at hand. It is one of the lessons of the history of progress that when the time for reform has come you cannot resist it, though if you make the attempt, what you may do is to widen its character or precipitate its advent. Opponents, when the time has come, are not merely dragged at the chariot wheels of progress - they help to turn them. The strongest forces, whichever way it seems to work, does most to aid. The forces of greatest concentration here have been, in my view, on the one hand the Edinburgh University led by Sir Robert Christison, on the other the women claimants led by Dr Sophia Jex-Blake.

Eventual qualification as a physician

In 1874, Sophia Jex-Blake helped establish the London School of Medicine for Women, but also continued campaigning and studying. The Medical Act (39 and 40 Vict, Ch. 41) soon followed, which was an act to repeal the previous statute, while also permitting medical authorities to license all qualified applicants whatever their gender. The first organisation to take advantage of this new legislation was the Royal College of Physicians of Ireland, but before Jex-Blake applied to them, she passed the medical exams at the University of Berne, where she was awarded a medical doctorate in January 1877. Four months later, she had further success in Dublin and qualified as licentiate of the King and Queen's College of Physicians of Ireland, meaning she could at last be registered with the General Medical Council, the third registered woman doctor in the country.

Medical career

Jex-Blake returned to Edinburgh, where she leased a house at 4 Manor Place, and in June 1878, put up her brass plate – Edinburgh had its first woman doctor. Three months later, she opened an outpatient clinic at 73 Grove Street, Fountainbridge, where poor women could receive medical attention for a fee of a few pence. After her mother's death in 1881, Sophia Jex-Blake had a period of depressed reclusiveness. The dispensary expanded by 1885 was moved to larger premises at 6 Grove Street, where a small five-bed ward was added. The little outpatient clinic thus became the Edinburgh Hospital and Dispensary for Women. This was Scotland's first hospital for women staffed entirely by women.

In 1886, she established the Edinburgh School of Medicine for Women. Effectively a small extramural class, it was largely enabled by a small handful of profemale male physicians linked to the University of Edinburgh giving extramural classes open to men and women (which the university could not prevent). The first students included Elsie Inglis, Grace Ross Cadell, and her sister Georgina, but Jex-Blake's skill as a teacher did not match her role as a doctor. An acrimonious split emerged, with her students culminating in an infamous court case in 1889, where Jex-Blake was successfully sued for damages. Thereafter, the Cadell sisters pursued their studies with the more genial, though far younger, Elsie Inglis, who had set up a rival school, the Edinburgh College of Medicine for Women. Jex-Blake's school came to an effective end in 1892, when the University of Edinburgh began taking female students. The Elsie Inglis College continued until 1916, when it merged with the School of Medicine of the Royal Colleges of Edinburgh at Surgeons' Hall.

Jex-Blake lived and conducted her practice for 16 years in the house known as Bruntsfield Lodge on Whitehouse Loan. When she retired in 1889, the Edinburgh Hospital and Dispensary for Women and Children moved to this site, and became known as Bruntsfield Hospital, where it continued to function on the site until 1989.

Personal life
Jex-Blake is assumed to have been in a romantic relationship with Dr Margaret Todd. On Jex-Blake's retirement in 1899, they moved to Windydene, Mark Cross, Rotherfield, where Dr Todd wrote The Way of Escape in 1902 and Growth in 1906. Her home became a meeting place for former students and colleagues, and she welcomed writers and acquaintances from the world over.

Death and commemoration

Jex-Blake died at Windydene on 7 January 1912, two weeks before her 72nd birthday, and is buried at St Wulfrans, Ovingdean. Todd subsequently wrote The Life of Dr Sophia Jex-Blake.

The University of Edinburgh commemorated Jex-Blake with a plaque (by Pilkington Jackson) near the entrance to its medical school, honouring her as "Physician, pioneer of medical education for women in Britain, alumna of the University".

In 2015, an Historic Scotland plaque was unveiled to commemorate the Surgeons' Hall Riot of 18 November 1870.

The Edinburgh Seven were awarded the posthumous honorary MBChB degrees at the University of Edinburgh’s McEwan Hall on  6 July 2019. The degrees were collected on their behalf by a group of current students at Edinburgh Medical School. Medical student Simran Piya collected an honorary degree on behalf of Sophia Jex-Blake. The graduation was the first of a series of events planned by the University of Edinburgh to commemorate the achievements and significance of the Edinburgh Seven.

In 2020, Bellfield Brewery launched a new India pale ale named after Sophia Jex-Blake.

In 2021, a production of a dramatic piece  about the experiences of Jex-Blake and the Edinburgh Seven, Sophia, by Scottish playwright Frances Poet, was announced.

Relatives

Thomas William Jex-Blake (1832–1915), brother, headmaster of Rugby School from 1874 to 1887
Katharine Jex-Blake, niece, mistress of Girton College from 1916 to 1922
Henrietta Jex-Blake, niece, principal of Lady Margaret Hall from 1909 to 1921
Arthur John Jex-Blake, nephew, British physician and fellow of the Royal College of Physicians
Bertha Jex-Blake, niece, British physician who studied at the Edinburgh College of Medicine for Women established by her aunt, drowned near Whitby in 1915

Selected writings
 
  
   — written with Edith Pechey and Isabel Thorne

See also
Leith Hospital
London School of Medicine for Women
Queen's College, London
Margaret Todd (doctor)

Further reading 

 is available at the Internet Archive

References

External links

 
 JM Somerville, Dr Sophia Jex-Blake and the Edinburgh School of Medicine for Women, 1886–1898 (2005) (PDF)
  Harvard University. Corporation. Committee on Admitting Women to the Medical School. Report 1867. 23 March. HUA. Call #HUG 4823.72
 

1840 births
1912 deaths
English feminists
English suffragists
19th-century English medical doctors
English women medical doctors
People from Hastings
Alumni of the University of Edinburgh
Sophia
English LGBT people
LGBT feminists
British LGBT scientists
19th-century women physicians
People from Rotherfield
19th-century English women